The Golden Age (2014) is a novel by Australian author Joan London.

Plot summary 

Frank and Elsa meet at a rehabilitation clinic in suburban Perth in the early 1950s.  Both have been stricken with polio, and Frank is a refugee from Hungary.  The novel follows the relationship between Frank and Elsa across the years.

Notes 

 Dedication: For my three sisters.

Reviews 

 The Monthly
 Sydney Review of Books

Awards and nominations 

 2015 shortlisted the Stella Prize 
 2015 shortlisted Miles Franklin Literary Award
 2015 shortlisted Kibble Literary Awards — Nita Kibble Literary Award 
 2015 shortlisted ASAL Awards — ALS Gold Medal 
 2015 shortlisted Australian Book Industry Awards (ABIA) — Australian Literary Fiction Book of the Year

References

2014 Australian novels
Novels set in the 1950s
Vintage Books books